In the first edition of the tournament, Yayuk Basuki won the title by defeating Ann Grossman 6–4, 6–4 in the final.

Seeds

Draw

Finals

Top half

Bottom half

References

External links
 Official results archive (ITF)
 Official results archive (WTA)

Danamon Open
1993 WTA Tour